Fotoamator (internationally released as Photographer ) is a 1998 Polish documentary film directed by Dariusz Jablonski, examining the life of the Jewish population and their Nazi overseers in the Łódź Ghetto.

Subject
In 1987, several hundred color slides documenting scenes from the Łódź Ghetto during World War II were discovered in a second-hand bookstore in Vienna, Austria. These slides were the work of Walter Genewein, an Austrian citizen serving the Nazis. Being an accountant in the ghetto's council, he solicited for turning the ghetto into a prosperous and well-organised company, and since he was not just an ambitious office worker, but also an enthusiastic photographer, he recorded their "achievements" with a camera.

Genewein's slides are used by the authors to show—both through them and, to some extent, in spite of them—the real history of the Łódź Ghetto and the suffering and eventual extermination of the Polish Jews living there. The photographs are combined and compared with the recollections of Dr. Arnold Mostowicz, who worked as a doctor in the ghetto, and the last surviving witness of the events.

Awards 
 Adolf Grimme Awards 2000 – Documentary/Cultural
 Amsterdam International Documentary Film Festival 1999 – Joris Ivens Award
 Banff Television Festival 1999 – Banff Rockie Award
 Bavarian TV Award 1999
 Biarritz International Festival of Audiovisual Programming 1999 – Golden FIPA & Prix Planète
 Cracow Film Festival 1998 – Don Quixote Award
 DoubleTake Documentary Film Festival1998 – Jury Award

References

External links

 Fotoamator discussed on www.culture.pl

1998 films
Documentary films about the Holocaust
Polish documentary films
1998 documentary films
Łódź Ghetto
Documentary films about Poland
Films scored by Michał Lorenc